Central City (formerly known as Surrey Place Mall) is a mixed-use development that houses a shopping mall, a university campus and an office tower complex in Surrey, British Columbia, Canada. It is owned by Blackwood Partners Management Corporation.

The Central City tower, main entrance and galleria were designed by Bing Thom Architects. The tower houses one of the three Simon Fraser University campuses. The complex is located near two SkyTrain stations – Surrey Central and King George – and is the second-largest shopping centre in Surrey after Guildford Town Centre.

History and development

Originally, the shopping centre was built in the 1970s as Surrey Place Mall, a standalone shopping centre, and was managed and owned by the Insurance Corporation of British Columbia. It underwent renovations and refurbishments throughout the 1980s and 1990s; however, the popularity of Guildford Town Centre began to challenge the mall's position as a dominant shopping centre in Surrey. In the late 1990s, the foot traffic of the mall suffered severely and many stores became untenanted. However, in 1999, part of the mall was sold off and was redeveloped, with the addition of an expansion to the mall including a new podium and a high-rise office tower also known as the Central City tower. From 2003 to 2017, the Central City tower was the tallest building in Surrey. In 2007, the rest of Central City mall was sold to Blackwood Partners Management Corporation.

The mall was affected by the closings of Target Canada and Future Shop, but Walmart Canada took over Target Canada's location along with Future Shop's former Best Buy-branded location. , given the mixed use of the complex—which includes space dedicated to retail, educational, and office uses—along with an increase in residential condominium density in the surrounding area, the mall has become busier than it was in the preceding decade.

Anchor tenants

Current
Walmart
Winners
Best Buy
The Brick
Shoppers Drug Mart
Simon Fraser University
T & T Supermarket
Dollarama

Former
Zellers – in former The Bay location, closed February 11, 2013; was replaced by Target on November 13, 2013
The Bay – closed May 8, 2000, Zellers relocated in this space, now Walmart
Sears – closed June 4, 2005, (now T & T Supermarket)
Target – in former Zellers location, (opened November 13, 2013, closed April 1, 2015); replaced by Walmart on February 25, 2016
Future Shop – closed March 28, 2015, due to consolidation as Best Buy; reopened as Best Buy in late 2015
Bed Bath & Beyond – closed January 2020

Simon Fraser University
Unlike other shopping centres in the region, and owing to its unique two-stage development, the main building of Simon Fraser University's Surrey campus is located within the mall and occupies a major portion of the podium floors. The central atrium of the mall, similar to the hull of a ship, consists of retail space on the ground floor and provides a direct line of sight towards the campus hallways and classrooms on the upper floors.

Transportation
Central City Shopping Centre is accessible to the regional SkyTrain system, with the closest station being Surrey Central station. The terminus King George station is also within five minutes' walking distance to the south. The Surrey Central bus loop is adjacent to Surrey Central station and serves as a transfer point to several routes which serve the region.

Gallery

See also
List of tallest buildings in Surrey
List of tallest buildings in British Columbia

External links
Central City Shopping Centre official site
Simon Fraser University Surrey

References

Shopping malls in Metro Vancouver
Shopping malls established in 2003
2003 establishments in British Columbia
Buildings and structures in Surrey, British Columbia